The 1977 Davis Cup was the 66th edition of the Davis Cup, the most important tournament between national teams in men's tennis. 59 teams would enter the competition, 33 in the Europe Zone, 14 in the Americas Zone, and 12 in the Eastern Zone. Algeria made its first appearance in the tournament.

Argentina defeated the United States in the Americas Zone final, Australia defeated New Zealand in the Eastern Zone final, and France and Italy were the winners of the two Europe Zones, defeating Romania and Spain respectively.

In the Inter-Zonal Zone, Australia defeated Argentina and Italy defeated France in the semifinals. Australia then defeated the defending champions Italy in the final to win their 24th title overall and their first since 1973. The final was held at the White City Stadium in Sydney, Australia on 2–4 December.

Politics in the Davis Cup
Throughout the 1960s and 1970s the Davis Cup had been affected by a number of protests and defaults by teams showing their opposition to the apartheid policies and white minority rule in South Africa and Rhodesia, and the human rights violations which occurred in Chile under Augusto Pinochet's military junta. 

Several high-profile incidents included Mexico's refusal to play South Africa in the 1975 and 1976 Americas Zones, widespread protests in Sweden against the Pinochet junta during the 1975 Inter-Zonal semifinal between Sweden and Chile, and South Africa being awarded the Cup by default in 1974 after India refused to travel to South Africa for the final.

This show of political will in a sporting context was not welcomed by some, and for a brief time the United States, the inaugural winner of the cup, announced their decision to withdraw from the competition due to the apparent lenience of the tournament's organisers to prevent defaults by teams. In a show of solidarity, Great Britain and France also announced their intention to withdraw.

In response to these withdrawals, the Davis Cup committee made a greater commitment to keep politics out of the competition. The committee subsequently disqualified the Soviet Union as punishment for refusing to play  Chile in the 1976 Inter-Zonal semifinals - the Soviets had already been barred from competing in the Federation Cup for refusing to play against South Africa and Rhodesia - from the tournament. The Soviet Union would have their entry rejected in 1978 after informing officials they would refuse to compete against South Africa.

Proposals were also brought forward to bring in an automatic one-year ban for any nation which pulled out of the tournament after the draw had been made, in an effort to prevent teams from defaulting on political grounds:  The United States, Great Britain and France all returned and competed in the 1977 tournament.

Americas Zone

Preliminary rounds

Main Draw

Final
Argentina vs. United States

Eastern Zone

Preliminary rounds

Main Draw

Final
New Zealand vs. Australia

Europe Zone

Zone A

Pre-qualifying rounds

Preliminary rounds

Main Draw

Final
France vs. Romania

Zone B

Pre-qualifying rounds

Preliminary rounds

Main Draw

Final
Spain vs. Italy

Inter-Zonal Zone

Draw

Semifinals
Argentina vs. Australia

Italy vs. France

Final
Australia vs. Italy

References

External links
Davis Cup Official Website

 
Davis Cup
Davis Cup
Davis Cup
Davis Cup
Davis Cup
Davis Cup
Davis Cup